Morfydd Llwyn Owen (1 October 1891 – 7 September 1918) was a Welsh composer, pianist and mezzo-soprano. A prolific composer, as well as a member of influential intellectual circles, she died shortly before her 27th birthday.

Early life and education

Owen was born in Treforest, Wales on 1 October 1891 to William Owen and his wife, Sara Jane (née Jones). Her parents were both amateur musicians who ran a drapery business. She was a musical child, showing great talent at an early age and received piano lessons early on.  While in her teens she appeared as a soloist in a performance of the Grieg Piano Concerto. At 16 she began to study piano and composition with Dr David Evans in Cardiff and had her first published work, a hymn tune entitled "Morfydd", produced in 1909.

After two years of study with Evans, Owen won a scholarship to study at the University College in Cardiff and was formally admitted into the composition class. Many of her works were performed in student recitals at Cardiff, and she graduated in 1912. The same year, she was admitted to the Gorsedd of the Bards at the Wrexham National Eisteddfod under the name Morfydd Llwyn Owen, honouring the placename of her father's Montgomeryshire home Plas Llwyn Owen by adopting 'Llwyn' as her middle name.

Owen's parents were reluctant for her to continue her studies in London, but were persuaded to allow this partly by the intervention of the Liberal politician Eliot Crawshay-Williams. Owen and her father had jointly set Crawshay-Williams' poem Lullaby at Sunset to music, and her father wrote to him requesting permission for this to be published. Owen took her BA in music in July 1912 and was accepted by the Royal Academy of Music on the Goring Thomas scholarship, which she held for four years.

She took up her place at the Royal Academy in September 1912 where her principal study was composition, with piano and singing as second studies. She received individual composition lessons with Frederick Corder, who taught several other notable British composers. She was a very successful student and won two prizes in her first year: the Charles Lucas medal for composition, for her Nocturne in D major, and the Oliveria Prescott prize for general excellence. She continued to accumulate awards during her time at the Royal Academy where her works – songs, part-songs and piano pieces including a sonata, pieces for violin and piano, trio for violin, cello and piano – were performed.

Life and career in London

While she was in London, Owen formed two separate circles of friends. The first of these centred on the Charing Cross Welsh Presbyterian Chapel, which was a central gathering point for many Welsh people living in London.  Owen developed an especially close friendship with Lady Ruth Lewis, the wife of Sir John Herbert Lewis, the Liberal MP for Flintshire. Lady Lewis was an important figure in the Welsh Folk-Song Society of London and invited Owen to become involved with the organization. Owen obliged and transcribed, as well as wrote accompaniments to, many pieces for collections of Welsh Folk Songs. She provided musical examples to illustrate Lady Lewis's lectures on folk song and in 1914 they collaborated in publishing Folk-Songs Collected in Flintshire and the Vale of Clwyd. Owen knew David Lloyd George, then Secretary of State for War, who commissioned a work and chose her as the soprano soloist at the Cymanfa Ganu of the National Eisteddfod in Aberystwyth in 1916.

Owen's other social circle was centred on Hampstead, where she shared a flat with her friend Elizabeth Lloyd. Hampstead was the centre of the London literary set, and Owen associated with several of its members, including the writers D. H. Lawrence and Ezra Pound.  She also was friends with several Russian émigrés, including Prince Felix Yusupov, who had been involved in the assassination of Rasputin, and Alexis Chodak-Gregory, who proposed marriage. It was through her Russian friendships, as well as influence of her work with Lady Lewis, that Owen developed a fascination with Russian folk song.  In 1915 she asked for, and received, a fellowship from the University of Wales to visit Saint Petersburg to study the folk music of Russia, Norway and Finland. However, the First World War made overseas travel impossible.

Having developed her voice as a mezzo-soprano, in 1913 she sang four of her own songs in a concert at London's Bechstein Hall: Chanson de Fortunio; Song from a Persian Village, Suo Gân and The Year's at the Spring.  The same year her Nocturne in D major was performed at the Queen's Hall, and she won the first prize for singing at a regional eisteddfod in Swansea. Her professional debut as a singer was in January 1917 at the Aeolian Hall in London. In July 1917 she premiered a performance of Harry Farjeon's song cycle A Lute of Jade at the Birkenhead National Eisteddfod.  Later in the year her setting of the song For Jeanne's Sake was performed at the Henry Wood Promenade Concerts.

Owen was made a sub-professor at the Royal Academy of Music and in 1918 she was honoured with the Academy's Associate diploma, the ARAM.

Marriage and death

Towards the end of 1916 Owen was introduced to the London Welsh psychoanalyst Ernest Jones and after a brief courtship they married at Marylebone Register Office on 6 February 1917. This came as shock to her circle of friends, few of whom were aware the ceremony was taking place. Her parents were unable to attend after Jones brought forward the ceremony by a day.  As the leading exponent in Britain of Freud's ideas Jones was a highly controversial figure and an avowed atheist. He anticipated his wife would gradually relinquish the "simple-minded" beliefs of her religious faith. In response to the evident tensions in the marriage around this issue, Jones agreed to a marriage ceremony at the Charing Cross Welsh Presbyterian Chapel, which took place the following September with Owen's family and friends present. There were also tensions in the marriage around the role Jones expected his wife to take in supporting his busy professional and social life, inevitably at the expense of her career as a musician and output as a composer.

In the summer of 1918 the couple were holidaying in South Wales, staying at the home of Jones's father at Oystermouth near Swansea, when Owen developed an acute appendicitis. Jones hoped his brother-in-law, the eminent surgeon Wilfred Trotter, would be able to travel to Swansea in time to operate but Trotter advised urgent surgical intervention was needed and the operation was conducted at the family home by William Frederick Brook, a leading South Wales surgeon. In his autobiography Jones gives an account of the days leading to her death on 7 September: 

On the basis of Jones's reference to "the best personal news" in his correspondence with Freud, Jones's biographer, Brenda Maddox, suggests that the reason that there was no subsequent autopsy was that Owen was pregnant and to have revealed this to her father and friends would have caused them further distress.

Owen was buried on 11 September in Oystermouth Cemetery, on the outskirts of Swansea, where her gravestone bears the inscription, chosen by Jones from Goethe's Faust: "Das Unbeschreibliche, hier ist's getan". 

In 1924 Jones arranged, with the assistance of Frederick Corder, the publication of a four-volume memorial edition of selections of her orchestral and instrumental work and of her compositions for voice and piano. Thanking Jones for the copy he sent her, her close friend Elizabeth Lloyd wrote, "Each page brought fresh memories of our lost darling". Centenary editions of some of her songs and piano pieces were published in Cardiff in 1991.

Works

Though Owen only composed seriously for just over 10 years, she left a legacy of some 250 scores. These include pieces for chamber ensemble, piano, mixed choir and tone poems for orchestra.  However, it is her compositions for voice and piano that are regarded as her most important and mature contributions. Her most well known include Slumber Song of the Madonna, To our Lady of Sorrows, Suo Gân, and her masterpiece in Welsh, Gweddi y Pechadur.  There were also some 22 hymn tunes and several anthems.

In the centenary year of her death, the 2018 Proms season programmed the BBC National Orchestra of Wales and its Principal Conductor Thomas Søndergård performing the Nocturne in D major for full orchestra of 1913.

Selected compositions
Works from the 1924 memorial edition of Owen's work, with authors' names in brackets.

Orchestral works

Choral works

Chamber music

Piano music

Hymn tunes

Songs

Discography
Morfydd Owen: Portrait of a Lost Icon performed by Elin Manahan Thomas, soprano and Brian Ellsbury, piano, recorded by Tŷ Cerdd, 2016 (CD).
This recording of songs and piano works includes the Four Flower Songs, Gweddi y Pechadur (The Sinner's Prayer), Branwen (the original piano sketch for the 1916 piece for strings Threnody for the Passing of Branwen), the Piano Sonata in E minor (1910) and the Rhapsody in C minor (1914)

 Welsh Impressions performed by Zoe Smith, piano, recorded by Tŷ Cerdd, 2019 (CD)
This recording of Welsh solo piano music takes its title from and features the Four Welsh Impressions.

Works in compilation recordings
Great Welsh Songs performed by Stuart Burrows and John Constable, recorded by Enigma, 1978 (LP)
Composers of Wales performed by Janet Price, Kenneth Bowen et al., recorded by Argo, 1974 (LP)
Y Teulu O'Neill performed by Andrew O'Neill, Dennis O'Neill, et al., recorded by Sain, 1980 (LP)
Cerddoriaeth Cymru: The Music of Wales performed by Osian Ellis, John Scott, et al., recorded by Curiad, 1996 (CD)
Songs of Dilys Elwyn-Edwards and Morfydd 'Llwyn' Owen performed by Helen Field, recorded by Sain, 2005 (CD)

References

Bibliography
 Cleaver, Emrys (1968). "Morfydd Llwyn Owen (1891-1918)" in Musicians of Wales. Ruthin: John Jones.
 
 Davies, Rhian (1994). Never So Pure a Sight: Morfydd Owen (1891–1918) A Life in Pictures. Llandysul: Gomer.
 "
 
 Davies, T.G. (2018) "Marwolaeth Morfudd Llwyn Owen", Y Traethodydd  vol. 173, no. 725.
 Fuller, Sophie (1994). "Morfydd Owen: 1891-1918." The Pandora Guide to Women Composers, Britain and the United States 1629 – present  London: Pandora.
 
 
 
 
Morfydd Owen Memorial Edition, 4 Volumes. The Anglo-French Music Company Ltd, London 1924
Vol. I Songs 1916-1918
Vol. II Songs 1911-1914
Vol. III Selected Pianoforte Works 
Vol. IV. Nocturne in D major for orchestra.

External links 
 
 
 
The Morfydd Owen archive is housed at Special Collections and Archives, Cardiff University.
BBC Artists Page
 Scores published by Oriana Publications
Scores published by Cardiff University Library Special Collections on The Internet Archive

1891 births
1918 deaths
Welsh classical composers
People from Pontypridd
Alumni of Cardiff University
Alumni of the Royal Academy of Music
Welsh mezzo-sopranos
20th-century classical composers
20th-century Welsh women singers
Women classical composers
20th-century classical pianists
Welsh classical pianists
Deaths from chloroform
20th-century British composers
20th-century women composers
20th-century women pianists